Yellow Creek is a stream in Chariton County in the U.S. state of Missouri. It is a tributary of the Grand River.

Yellow Creek was named for the deposits of yellow clay along its course.

See also
List of rivers of Missouri

References

Rivers of Chariton County, Missouri
Rivers of Missouri